Nikos Masouras (born 15 June 2001) is a Greek professional footballer who plays as a left winger.

Career statistics

Club

Notes

References

2001 births
Living people
Greek footballers
Greece youth international footballers
Association football midfielders
Panachaiki F.C. players
Footballers from Preveza